The Albert H. Tanner House is a Stick–Eastlake style house located at 2248 Northwest Johnson Street in Portland, Oregon. It was built in 1893 and has been listed on the National Register of Historic Places since 1983.

See also
 National Register of Historic Places listings in Northwest Portland, Oregon

References

1893 establishments in Oregon
Houses completed in 1893
Houses on the National Register of Historic Places in Portland, Oregon
Northwest Portland, Oregon
Stick-Eastlake architecture in Oregon
Historic district contributing properties in Oregon
1890s architecture in the United States